Yunganastes pluvicanorus is a species of frog in the family Strabomantidae. It is endemic to Bolivia and found on the eastern slopes of the Cordillera Oriental in the Cochabamba and Santa Cruz Departments.

Description
Adult males measure  and adult females  in snout–vent length. The head is wider than it is long; the snout is rounded. The tympanum is ovoid. The dorsa-lateral folds start from above the tympanum and extend to the groin. The canthus rostralis is sharp. Neither fingers nor toes have webbing or lateral fringes. The outer fingers have expanded discs; the toe discs are small. Dorsal skin is shagreened. The dorsum is beige to brown and has some darker markings. There is a dark brown canthal and supra-tympanic stripe. The upper lip has irregular brown blotches. The limbs are barred. The venter is cream, bearing some brown spots. Males have a large vocal sac.

Habitat and conservation
It is both diurnal and nocturnal; males call both day and night on the ground or perching on bushes.

Yunganastes pluvicanorus is threatened by habitat loss and degradation caused primarily by agriculture. Carrasco and Amboró National Parks might protect it.

References

pluvicanorus
Amphibians of the Andes
Amphibians of Bolivia
Endemic fauna of Bolivia
Taxa named by John Douglas Lynch
Amphibians described in 1997
Taxonomy articles created by Polbot